The Tsar's Bride is a 1965 Soviet drama film directed by Vladimir Gorikker.

Plot 
The film is based on the eponymous opera by Nikolai Rimsky-Korsakov.

Cast 
 Raisa Nedashkovskaya as Marfa
 Natalya Rudnaya as Lyubasha
 Otar Koberidze as Grigori Gryaznoy
 Georgi Shevtsov as Malyuta Skuratov (as G. Shevtsov)
 Vladimir Zeldin as Bomely
 Nikolai Timofeyev as Sobakin
 Viktor Nuzhny as Ivan Lykov
 Marina Maltseva as Dunyasha
 Tamara Loginova as Saburova
 Pyotr Glebov as Tsar Ivan

References

External links 
 

1965 films
1960s Russian-language films
Soviet drama films
Cultural depictions of Ivan the Terrible
1965 drama films